John Smethurst (9 April 1932 – 16 February 2022) was an English television and film comic actor. He was best known for his role as Eddie Booth in the British television sitcom Love Thy Neighbour.

Early life 
Smethurst was born on 9 April 1932 in Collyhurst, Manchester.

Career
He made his film debut in 1958's Carry On Sergeant. This was followed by parts in the films Saturday Night and Sunday Morning (1960), A Kind of Loving (1962), Run with the Wind (1966), Night After Night After Night (1970), the big-screen version of Please Sir! (1971) and the ITV sitcom For the Love of Ada (1970–71) amongst others, before he landed the role for which he is best known—that of bigoted socialist and union leader, 'brother' Eddie Booth in Love Thy Neighbour. The programme ran for eight series between 1972 and 1976. During this run he also appeared in the 1974 film version of the sitcom Man About the House. He reprised his role as Eddie Booth for the 1979 sequel Love Thy Neighbour in Australia.

After Love Thy Neighbour ended, his film appearances were rare, but included Chariots of Fire (1981), the John Goodman vehicle King Ralph (1991; which re-united him with his Love Thy Neighbour co-star Rudolph Walker) and 1996's La Passione.

He made a guest appearance as Davenport in Britain's longest-running television sitcom Last of the Summer Wine in 1997.

He played four different characters in Coronation Street: a brewery drayman in 1961, and in January 1967 Percy Bridge, who tried to con Elsie Tanner. Between 1980 and 1983, he occasionally appeared as Johnny Webb, one of the men on Eddie Yeats' bin round. In 2001, he returned for several months as Stan Wagstaff, a friend of Jimmy Kelly, who left his allotment to Jack Duckworth. Together with his brother Ernie, Stan let Jack in on Jimmy's big secret—he used his allotment shed to brew poteen.

Smethurst also starred in Vince Powell’s seven-part BBC Radio 2 slice-of-life sitcom A Proper Charlie in 1984, as factory worker Charlie Garside. Madge Hindle played his wife with Jane Hazlegrove and Jason Littler as their daughter and son. A second series of eight episodes followed at the end of 1985.

He worked on stage in Australia when he appeared in the play Run for Your Wife during 1987 and 1988, and the production toured the country. Other members of the cast were David McCallum, Eric Sykes and Katy Manning. Smethurst appeared in a production of Agatha Christie's And Then There Were None in 1999.

Smethurst played the "Man in Phone Box" in S5/E8 (1995) of the British sitcom Keeping Up Appearances. In the episode, Hyacinth Bucket tries to get Smethurst's character to relinquish a public telephone booth, which leads her husband, Richard, to yell at her forcefully for the only time in the entire series.

Personal life and death
Smethurst married actress Julie Nicholls in 1957. The couple had four children; Perdita, Merry, Jane and Adam. His son Adam, also an actor, is married to the Welsh actress Rakie Ayola. Smethurst died at his home in Chorleywood on 16 February 2022, at the age of 89.

Selected filmography

References

External links
 

1932 births
2022 deaths
20th-century English male actors
21st-century English male actors
20th-century Royal Air Force personnel
Alumni of the London Academy of Music and Dramatic Art
British male comedy actors
English male stage actors
English male television actors
Male actors from Manchester
People from Collyhurst